This is a list of electrical generating stations in Ontario, Canada.

Nuclear 
Nuclear power accounts for roughly 60% of Ontario's power generation, and represents the baseload of its power supply. The government plans to maintain nuclear power's role in energy generation through to 2025. Ontario currently has 16 nuclear units in operation. These reactors amount to 11,400 MW of generation capacity and are located at three sites. The stations were constructed by the provincial Crown corporation, Ontario Hydro.  In April 1999 Ontario Hydro was split into 5 component Crown corporations with Ontario Power Generation (OPG) taking over all electrical generating stations.

Fossil fuel 
List of all fossil fuel generating stations in Ontario.

Renewable

Biomass 
List of biomass electrical generating stations in Ontario.

Hydroelectric 
List of all hydroelectric generating stations in Ontario.

Wind 

List of all wind farms in Ontario.

Solar

List of all solar farms in Ontario.

Notes and references
Notes

References

See also 

 Ontario Power Generation
 Electricity policy of Ontario
 Energy in Canada
 List of electrical generating stations in Canada

External links
"Where is my Electricity Coming From at this Hour? (if I lived in Ontario)" (Canadian Nuclear Society, with data from IESO)

Lists of power stations in Canada
Generating stations